Kayjay is an unincorporated community located in Knox County, Kentucky, United States. Its name comes from the initials of the Kentucky-Jellico Coal Company.

References

Unincorporated communities in Knox County, Kentucky
Unincorporated communities in Kentucky
Coal towns in Kentucky